Clock Knot is an outdoor painted steel sculpture by Mark di Suvero, installed on the University of Texas at Austin campus, in Austin, Texas, United States. The approximately  sculpture was installed along Dean Keeton Street in 2007.

References

External links

 

Outdoor sculptures in Austin, Texas
Steel sculptures in Texas
University of Texas at Austin campus
Works by Mark di Suvero